Two Pages is the third studio album by English electronic music group 4hero, released via Talkin' Loud on 13 July 1998. It peaked at number 38 on the UK Albums Chart. The album was shortlisted for the Mercury Music Prize in 1998.

A connected remix album called Two Pages Remixed was released shortly after the original album in Japan only, with an alternatively titled Two Pages Reinterpretations being released the following year in the UK.

Track listing 
1 CD version

2 CD version

4 LP vinyl version

Charts

References

External links 
 

1998 albums
4hero albums
Talkin' Loud albums